Marcelo Maldonado Peixoto (born November 5, 1967), also known as Marcelo D2, is a Brazilian rapper and singer.

Biography 
A former vocalist of the band Planet Hemp, he started his solo career in 1998 with the album Eu Tiro É Onda. The album was recorded in his studio by David Corcos, and was mixed in New York City and Los Angeles by Carlos Bass and Mario Caldato Eu Tiro É Onda was well accepted by the public and rap movement within São Paulo, earning respect from names such as Black Alien, Zé Gonzalez and Bnegão.

Marcelo returned to Rio de Janeiro with a pregnant girlfriend who gave birth to his son Luca. He found renewed success after restarting his solo career with the participation of the Hemp Family, a group formed by the pioneers of rap in Rio de Janeiro.

In 2003 he released À Procura da Batida Perfeita (Portuguese for "Looking for the perfect beat", a reference to an Afrika Bambaataa song of the same name) produced by Beastie Boys producer Mario Caldato. The album mixed hip-hop with samba, and included a collaboration with will.i.am from The Black Eyed Peas. The album was a hit, and led to an Acústico MTV performance, analogous to MTV Unplugged in the United States. The album was released with the English title in Asia, Europe, and North America. Finally, the album was promoted with a two-year tour.

Marcelo D2 appeared as a guest performer on two tracks of Sérgio Mendes' album Timeless.

His third album Meu Samba É Assim ("My Samba Is Like This") was released May 8, 2006. It features Chali 2na of Jurassic 5 on the track "That's What I Got".

In 2010, Marcelo D2's video "Meu Tambor" was nominated for Video of the Year for MTV Brasil.

His album Amor É Para os Fortes was elected as one of the 25 best Brazilian albums of the second half of 2018 by the São Paulo Association of Art Critics.

In 2021, his album Assim Tocam Meus Tambores was nominated for the Latin Grammy Award for Best Portuguese Language Rock or Alternative Album.

Discography

Studio albums

Live albums

Video albums

Compilations

Singles

Trivia 
 In 2011, he was the only artist who played at both Rock in Rio and SWU Music & Arts.
 Some of his songs were used in the Turistas soundtrack.
 His biggest radio hit is the song "Qual É?", which has featured on the popular TV show Cidade dos Homens.
 The "Loadeando" music video features his son, Stephen, several times.
 On July 7, 2007, he performed at the Brazilian leg of Live Earth in Rio de Janeiro.
 The song Desabafo is used as Brazilian UFC fighter, Paulo Thiago's entrance song. It is also featured in Fast Five.
The song 'Profissão MC' appears on the soundtrack to the game FIFA Football 2005.
The song 'Você Diz Que o Amor Não Dói' appears on the soundtrack to the game FIFA 14.
He is a fan of Rio-based football club Flamengo.

References

External links 
 
 [

Brazilian rappers
Musicians from Rio de Janeiro (city)
1967 births
Living people
Latin music songwriters